Randolph Woods (born September 23, 1970) is an American former professional basketball player.

College career
In college, Woods tallied 1,811 points in three seasons, ranking him fifth on La Salle's all-time scoring list at end of his career. He finished first in total points (847) and fifth in points-per-game (27.3) among all Division I players in 1992. The 1992 MAAC Player of the Year, Woods received the Geasey Award as the Big 5 Player of the Year in 1992 and was inducted into the Big 5 Hall of Fame in 1998.  He was also inducted into the La Salle Hall of Athletes in 2003.

Professional career
Woods was selected by the Los Angeles Clippers with the 16th overall pick of the 1992 NBA draft. Woods played in four NBA seasons for the Clippers and Denver Nuggets, averaging 2.4 ppg in his career.

External links
Randy Woods NBA statistics, basketballreference

1970 births
Living people
21st-century African-American sportspeople
African-American basketball players
American expatriate basketball people in Greece
American expatriate basketball people in Spain
American men's basketball players
Basketball players from Philadelphia
Denver Nuggets players
La Salle Explorers men's basketball players
Liga ACB players
Los Angeles Clippers draft picks
Los Angeles Clippers players
Papagou B.C. players
Point guards
Quad City Thunder players
Real Betis Baloncesto players
Sioux Falls Skyforce (CBA) players
Yakima Sun Kings players
20th-century African-American sportspeople